Blaire White (born September 14, 1993) is an American YouTuber and political commentator. Describing her politics as center-right, White has been publicly critical of leftist movements and rose to fame as one of the few openly trans YouTube creators to make such content.

Early life 
White described feeling gender dysphoria from a young age, saying that "my earliest memories were those of gender dysphoria: feeling uncomfortable in my skin and incapable of meeting male ideals". When she was 20 years old, she came out as transgender to her family and friends and began feminizing hormone therapy in 2015. While studying computer science at California State University, Chico, White appeared on a friend's live stream where commenters encouraged her to start a YouTube channel of her own. Prior to starting on YouTube, she was a self-described "social justice warrior" and held liberal political views, but stated her beliefs changed after starting college. White has also stated she is half white and half Latina.

YouTube career 
While studying at college in December 2015 White began posting anti-feminist political videos to YouTube.  Later she continued making videos discussing gender politics  as well as videos criticizing transgender activists and the movement Black Lives Matter.

White has uploaded political debates with other YouTubers, commentators and comedians including Ben Shapiro, ContraPoints, and Onision. She has appeared on the political talk show The Rubin Report to discuss the North Carolina Public Facilities Privacy & Security Act, which requires individuals to only use restrooms and changing facilities that correspond to the sex on their birth certificates.

In February 2017, White was banned from social networking platform Facebook for 30 days, drawing complaints from her supporters. Her account was reinstated shortly afterwards, and Facebook said the ban was an error. That same year, White began uploading videos about her personal life, including about her gender affirming surgeries.

On November 11, 2017, White and her boyfriend filmed a video in which they wore hats bearing the Trump slogan "Make America Great Again" and attended an anti-Trump protest on Hollywood Boulevard. In the video, she claims to have been assaulted twice, had her nail ripped off, and had a drink thrown in her face. Police say that White and her boyfriend began the altercation when they crossed a divider between pro- and anti-Trump protesters.

In 2018, she told Penthouse that she had had to contact the Federal Bureau of Investigation as a result of backlash.

In August 2019, White hosted a debate with transgender activist Jessica Yaniv centered around Yaniv's human rights complaint. During the debate, Yaniv brandished a taser on camera, resulting in her arrest in Canada.

In 2021, White said of the Super Straight trend that "The fact that people are upset about this new sexuality being created is a little hypocritical coming from the folks who created abrosexual, demisexual, gerontosexual, gynosexual, intrasexual, kalosexual, multisexual, pomosexual, sapiosexual, and literally hundreds more" and that "Even though super-straight is a joke, the irony is that it's a lot more valid than a lot of those I just listed. Actually, all of them."

Janae Marie Kroc controversy 

In October 2020, White received criticism and backlash following a video she posted about transgender athlete Janae Marie Kroc. White claimed that Kroc competes against cisgender women in powerlifting events and unfairly has won events as a result. Afterwards, Kroc responded on Instagram saying that "everything she said about me was incorrect". Kroc clarified that she has only ever competed before she transitioned, in the men's division, and that she has not competed and does not ever intend to compete against other women. On October 15, White apologized on Twitter and deleted the video from her YouTube channel.

Political views 
In 2017, White described her political beliefs as center-right. She supported Donald Trump in the 2016 United States presidential election, but stated in 2018 that she remains critical of some of his policies and actions in office. For instance, White said that she was partly against Trump's transgender military ban. In a 2019 Vice debate, she identified as Republican.

Personal life 
White is engaged to fellow YouTuber Joey Sarson. Her mother's side of the family is supportive of her and her transition. White has expressed the desire to have children in the future through surrogacy or adoption, and has discussed her struggle with infertility due to the effects of hormones.

In 2019, White said that she is non-religious, stating that religion has had little significance in her life.

White is a California native and a former resident of Los Angeles. In 2020, White made a video about the cons of living in Los Angeles and announced that she and her fiancé were moving to Austin, Texas. They both moved in 2021.

References

External links 
 
 
 
 

1993 births
21st-century American women
American critics of Islam
American media personalities
American political commentators
American social commentators
American YouTubers
California Republicans
California State University, Chico alumni
Commentary YouTubers
Critics of Black Lives Matter
Female critics of feminism
Fullscreen (company) channels
LGBT conservatism in the United States
LGBT YouTubers
Living people
Men's rights activists
People from Tehama County, California
LGBT media personalities
Transgender women
YouTube channels launched in 2015
YouTubers who make LGBT-related content
YouTube vloggers
20th-century American LGBT people
21st-century American LGBT people
YouTube controversies
Latino conservatism in the United States
LGBT Hispanic and Latino American people